Abdelkebir Khatibi (11 February 1938 – 16 March 2009) was a prolific Moroccan literary critic, novelist, philosopher, playwright, poet, and sociologist. Affected in his late twenties by the rebellious spirit of 1960s counterculture, he challenged in his writings the social and political norms upon which the countries of the Maghreb region were constructed. His collection of essays  is one of his most notable works.

Career 

Khatibi was born on 11 February 1938, in the Atlantic port city of El Jadida. By the age of 12, he began to write poems, in Arabic and French, which he sent to the radio and newspapers. He studied in the French colonial school system, at Lycée Lyautey. He earned his doctorate in sociology under the Tunisian intellectual Albert Memmi at the Sorbonnein 1965. His dissertation, Le Roman maghrébin [The Maghribian Novel], which examines the question of how a novelist could avoid propagandizing in the context of a postrevolutionary society, and its follow-up, Bilan de la sociologie au Maroc [Assessment of Sociology Concerning Morocco] were both published shortly after the Paris Spring unrest of May 1968. 

He taught at Mohammed V University in Rabat and worked as a director of the Institut de sociologie (Institute of Sociology) from 1966 until the institute's closure in 1970. He was editor-in-chief of the journal ; he renamed it  in 1987. His landmark collection of critical essays Maghreb pluriel was published in 1983.

Final years 

In his later years, Abdelkebir Khatibi had been suffering from a chronic cardiac condition which led to his death in the Moroccan capital, Rabat, five weeks after his 71st birthday. During the final stages of his illness, a measure of the high regard in which he was held was seen in the personal concern of King Mohammed VI who directed his transfer to Morocco's premier medical facility, Sheikh Zayed Hospital.

Khatibi is survived by his widow and their two children.

Awards and honours 

 1977: Prix Broquette-Gonin for his work L’art calligraphique arabe
 1994: Prix du Rayonnement de la langue et de la littérature françaises
 1997: Prix Grand Atlas for his work Du Signe à l’image, le tapis marocain (co-author Ali Amahan)
 2008: Grand Prix SGDL de Poésie for his work Poésie de l'aimance

Partial bibliography

Letter collections

Essays

Novels 

La Mémoire tatouée [Tattooed Memory] (1971) 
 
 
De la mille et troisième nuit [From the Thousand and Third Night] (1980)
 

Un été à Stockholm''' [A Summer in Stockholm] (1992), Flamarion Triptyque de Rabat [Rabat Triptych] (1993)

 Plays 

 La Mort des artistes [The Death of the Artists] (1964)
 Le Prophète voilé [The Veiled Prophet] (1979)

 Poetry 

 
 
 

 Sociology 

 
 
 Études sociologiques sur le Maroc [Sociological Studies Regarding Morocco''] (1971)

Writings on Abdelkebir

References

External links 
 List of works by and about Abdelkebir Khatibi
 Abdelkebir Khatibi in Encyclopædia Britannica Online

1938 births
2009 deaths
20th-century dramatists and playwrights
20th-century male writers
20th-century Moroccan philosophers
Moroccan dramatists and playwrights
Moroccan male writers
Male dramatists and playwrights
Moroccan literary critics
Moroccan sociologists
People from El Jadida
University of Paris alumni
Winners of the Prix Broquette-Gonin (literature)